Saz (also Romanized as Sāz; also known as Sahāz) is a village in Poshtdarband Rural District, in the Central District of Kermanshah County, Kermanshah Province, Iran. At the 2006 census, its population was 206, in 44 families.

References 

Populated places in Kermanshah County